Suuremõisa  is a village in Hiiumaa Parish, Hiiu County in northwestern Estonia.

The village has 299 inhabitants and therefore is the largest village of the municipality.

Soviet Estonian politician Meta Vannas (1924–2002), was born in Suuremõisa.

Suuremõisa Manor
Suuremõisa is the site of the grandest baroque manor ensemble in Estonia. Although the history of the estate can be traced back to at least the 16th century, the current building was erected in 1755-60 by the Stenbock family. The architect supposedly was Joseph Gabriel Destain. In 1772, the main house was extended with two one-floor wings and a ceremonial courtyard. Inspiration for the architecture, notably the hipped mansard roof and the two wings, came from Ulriksdal Palace in Sweden. The building ensemble still displays some of the original details, like the fine carved baroque main door.

The manor has belonged to several well-known members of the nobility, both Swedish and Baltic German, for example Jacob De la Gardie (1583-1652), who, among other things, was Governor-General of Estonia, and his son Axel Julius De la Gardie (1637-1710), who held the same office. One of the most infamous and colourful landlords was Otto Reinhold Ludwig von Ungern-Sternberg (1744-1811), who practiced wrecking and was sent to Siberia in 1804 as a punishment for murdering a Swedish skipper. His extraordinary life has inspired both literary works and plenty of local lore.

The manor is surrounded by an English-style park.

References

External links
Suuremõisa manor at Estonian Manors Portal

Villages in Hiiu County
Kreis Wiek
Manor houses in Estonia
Tourist attractions in Hiiu County
Buildings and structures in Hiiu County